Magic is the fifth studio album by Japanese Jazz fusion band T-Square, who were then known as The Square. It was released on November 1, 1981.

Track listing
Sources

References

T-Square (band) albums
1981 albums